Loch Snizort is a sea loch in the northwest of the Isle of Skye between the Waternish and Trotternish peninsulas.  It is fed by the River Snizort, originating in the hills east of Bracadale. The mouth of Loch Snizort gives access to the lower Minch and contains the Ascrib Islands.

Sea fishing in Loch Snizort yields mackerel, pollock, and ling.

See also
 List of lochs in Scotland

Footnotes

External links 
 

Sea lochs of Scotland
Lochs of the Isle of Skye